Rudolph M. Smeja (December 1, 1920 – October 1982) was an American football player.  Smeja played  at the end position for the University of Michigan from 1941 to 1943.  In November 1943, Smeja intercepted a pass and returned it 35 yards for a touchdown on the first play of the fourth quarter in a 23–6 win over the Indiana Hoosiers.  At the end of the 1943 season, Smeja was selected as the starting left end for the Eastern All-Star team to play in the East-West Shrine Game in San Francisco on New Year's Day 1944.  He was drafted by the Chicago Bears in the first round (2nd overall pick) of the 1944 NFL Draft and played 18 games for the Bears in the 1944 and 1945 NFL seasons.  In the last game of the 1944 season, Smeja leaped high to spear a touchdown pass from Sid Luckman to help the Bears beat the previously unbeaten Philadelphia Eagles.  In 1946, Smeja played for the Philadelphia Eagles.  Smeja died in 1982 at age 61.

Personal life
Smeja was of Polish descent.

References

Michigan Wolverines football players
Chicago Bears players
Philadelphia Eagles players
1920 births
1982 deaths
American football ends
American people of Polish descent